This list of tallest buildings and structures in Brighton and Hove ranks skyscrapers and other structures by height in Brighton and Hove, United Kingdom, that are at least 40 metres tall.

Completed

An equal sign (=) following a rank indicates the same height between two or more buildings.

Proposed

An equal sign (=) following a rank indicates the same height between two or more buildings.

Demolished

See also
Buildings and architecture of Brighton and Hove

References

Bibliography

Lists of buildings and structures in Sussex
Lists of tallest buildings in the United Kingdom